Ismail Nazzal al-Armouti (died 23 January 2013) was a Jordanian politician. He served as Minister in several governments. One of those ministerships was as Minister of Municipal and Rural Affairs in 1976.

References

Year of birth missing
1930s births
2013 deaths
Municipal affairs ministers of Jordan